Harry Klagsbrun (born 1953/1954) is a Swedish billionaire and investor.

Biography
Klagsbrun graduated with a B.A. in journalism from Stockholm University, an M.B.A. from New York University and a Master of Economics from the Stockholm School of Economics. After school in 1982, he moved to New York City to work in corporate finance for Smith Barney. In 1989, he took a position as 989 to 1995 the Head of Corporate Finance at Svenska Handelsbanke. In 1995, he served as CEO of the Alfred Berg Group. In 2001, he accepted a position as senior executive and head of the asset management at the SEB Group. In 2006, he joined private equity firm EQT AB as a partner in 2006.

Personal life
Klagsbrun is married and lives in Stockholm, Sweden.

Net worth
Forbes lists his net worth as of April 2022 at $1.1 billion USD.

References 

Swedish billionaires
20th-century Swedish businesspeople
21st-century Swedish businesspeople
Living people
1950s births
Stockholm School of Economics alumni
New York University alumni
Stockholm University alumni